The 10th Pan American Games were held in Indianapolis, United States from 7 to 23 August 1987.

Medals

Gold

Silver

Bronze

Men's 20 km Road Walk: Querubín Moreno
Men's 50 km Road Walk: Héctor Moreno

Results by event

See also
Colombia at the 1988 Summer Olympics

Nations at the 1987 Pan American Games
P
Colombia at the Pan American Games